Dhappa is a 2019 Indian Marathi-language drama film directed by Nipun Dharmadhikari in his directorial debut. The film features several debutante child actors and was inspired by a true incident. The film was shown at various film festivals including Jio MAMI 20th Mumbai Film Festival.

Cast 
Deepali Borkar
Sharav Wadhawekar
Sharavi Kulkarni
Shrihari Abhyankar 
Akash Kamble
Jyoti Subhash
Girish Kulkarni
Iravati Harshe
Vrushali Kulkarni as Anuradha

Reception 
A critic from The Times of India rated the film  out of 5 and opined that "Dhappa is not an aesthetically outstanding film and it has some loose ends as well. But what it lacks there, the film makes up for through its execution and performances". A critic from Firstpost rated the film  out of 5 and said that "The film may set out to charm the viewer, but it does so with a bracing quality, and it is all put together in a palette that mashes whimsy with socio-political commentary, all in a non-cynical, positive sense". A critic from Lokmat rated the film  out of 5. A critic from Scroll.in wrote that "Nipun Dharmadhikari’s Marathi-language movie fires its message of inter-faith tolerance and the need for free speech over the shoulders of children".

Awards and nominations 
Nargis Dutt Award for Best Feature Film on National Integration - Won
Indian Panorama section of International Film Festival of India
Critics’ Choice Film Awards 2020
Best Director - Nominated
Best Film - Nominated
Best Writing - Nominated

References

External links

2019 films
2010s Marathi-language films
Indian drama films